ALSIB (or the Northern Trace) was the Soviet Union portion of the Alaska-Siberian air road receiving Lend-Lease aircraft from the Northwest Staging Route. Aircraft manufactured in the United States were flown over this route for World War II combat service on the Eastern Front.

Routing

United States ferry pilots delivered aircraft to Ladd Army Airfield in Fairbanks, Alaska. There each aircraft was serviced by USAAF personnel in preparation for Soviet inspection. After Soviet inspectors accepted the aircraft, five regiments of ferry pilots conveyed aircraft from Fairbanks to Soviet pilot training facilities near Krasnoyarsk. Each regiment was assigned to a specific segment of the route to become familiar with navigation and weather within that segment. Single-seat Bell P-39 Airacobra and Bell P-63 Kingcobra fighters flew in groups with a pair of multi-engine North American B-25 Mitchell or Douglas A-20 Havoc bombers. The lead bomber navigated for the flight and the trailing bomber watched for stragglers. Bombers and Douglas C-47 Skytrains might fly independently, and C-47s transported ferry pilots east for new aircraft.

1st regiment
Soviet First regiment pilots accepted the planes at Fairbanks and flew over the Bering Strait via St. Lawrence Island.
 Ladd Army Airfield 
 Galena Airport 
 Marks Army Airfield 
 Gambell Army Airfield 
 Uelkal

2nd regiment
Second regiment pilots flew from Uelkal to Seymchan.
 Uelkal
 Anadyr 
 Markovo 
 Seymchan Airport

3rd regiment
Third regiment pilots flew from Seymchan to Yakutsk.
 Seymchan
 Zyryanka West Airport 
 Susuman Airport 
 Oymyakon 
 Khandyga 
 Ust-Maya 
 Yakutsk Airport

4th regiment
Fourth regiment pilots flew from Yakutsk to Kirensk.
 Yakutsk
 Aldan 
 Olyokminsk 
 Bodaybo Airport 
 Vitim Airport 
 Kirensk Airport

5th regiment
Fifth regiment pilots flew from Kirensk to Krasnoyarsk.
 Kirensk
 Ust-Kut Airport 
 Krasnoyarsk Northeast

See also
 North Atlantic air ferry route in World War II
 South Atlantic air ferry route in World War II
 South Pacific air ferry route in World War II
 West Coast Wing (Air Transport Command route to Alaska)
 Crimson Route (Planned route from N America to Europe, later abandoned)

Notes

Sources

External links
 "ALSIB – The Route of Courage: Voice of Russia." Ruvr.ru. Retrieved 19 July 2012
 Map of the route from gcmap.com

Aircraft ferrying
Soviet Union–United States relations
Aviation in Alaska
World War II sites of the Soviet Union
Soviet Air Forces in World War II